Events from the year 1932 in art.

Events
 April 6–19 – German art dealer Otto Wacker is tried and convicted in Berlin for selling forged paintings he attributed to Vincent van Gogh and sentenced to 19 months in prison.
 June 16 – Pablo Picasso's retrospective exhibition opens at the Galeries Georges Petit in Paris, displaying 225 paintings.
 June 25 – An article in The Saturday Evening Post (US) claims that the 1911 theft of Leonardo da Vinci's Mona Lisa was partly masterminded by a forger named Yves Chaudron.
 August 2 – The Saint Petersburg Union of Artists is established (as the "Leningrad Union of Soviet Artists").
 October – Courtauld Institute of Art opens in London.
 October–November – Exhibition Carvings by Barbara Hepworth, Paintings by Ben Nicholson at the Arthur Tooth & Sons gallery in London.
 November 15 – First exhibition of Group f/64 photographers opens at the de Young Museum in San Francisco.
 November 30 – Exhibition American Folk Art: The Art of the Common Man in America 1750–1900 opens at the Museum of Modern Art in New York City.
 Alvar Aalto designs a new form of laminated bent-plywood furniture.
 The Wedgwood pottery firm in England first commissions designs from Keith Murray.
 First Abstraction-Création Cahier, Abstraction-création: Art non-figuratif, is produced.
 Sale of the late 12th century Japanese emakimono Kibi Daijin Nittō Emaki to the Museum of Fine Arts, Boston in the United States causes the Japanese government to impose restrictions on sale of significant artistic works from the country.

Works

Graphic art
 George Ault – Hoboken Factory
 Frank Brangwyn – British Empire Panels
 Stuart Davis – Men Without Women
 Edward Hopper
 Room in Brooklyn
 Room in New York
 Lois Mailou Jones – The Ascent of Ethiopia
 Frieda Kahlo
 Henry Ford Hospital
 My Birth
 Self Portrait on the Border Line Between Mexico and the United States
 Harold Knight
 Girl Reading
 Girl Writing
 Tamara de Lempicka
 Adam and Eve
 Portrait de Marjorie Ferry 
 René Magritte – The Universe Unmasked
 Rolf Nesch – Elbe Bridge I
 Ben Nicholson – Au Chat Botté
 Winifred Nicholson
 The Artist's Children, Kate and Jake, at the Isle of Wight
 Kate and Jake on the Isle of Wight
 Pablo Picasso
 Girl Before a Mirror (Museum of Modern Art, New York)
 La Lecture
 Nude in a Black Armchair
 Nude, Green Leaves and Bust
 Reclining Nude
 Reclining Nude (another version)
 Reclining Nude (another version)
 Le Rêve
 Charles Sheeler
 River Rouge Plant
 Interior with Stove (conté crayon)
 Amrita Sher-Gil – Young Girls
 Walter Sickert – Miss Earhart's Arrival (Tate Gallery, London)
 Xul Solar – Palacio Almi
 Stanley Spencer completes his series of paintings at Sandham Memorial Chapel, Burghclere

Photographs
 Henri Cartier-Bresson – Derrière la gare de Saint-Lazare
 Charles Clyde Ebbets – Lunch atop a Skyscraper
 John Heartfield – photomontages
 Adolf, the Superman
 The Meaning of Geneva, Where Capital Lives, There Can Be No Peace

Sculptures

 Alberto Giacometti – Woman with her Throat Cut
 Alfred Gilbert – Queen Alexandra Memorial
 Barbara Hepworth –  Pierced Form
 Joseph Klein – Statue of Thomas E. Watson
 Käthe Kollwitz – The Grieving Parents
 Gaston Lachaise – Standing Woman
 Leo Lentelli – The James Cardinal Gibbons Memorial Statue
 Alonzo Victor Lewis – American Doughboy Bringing Home Victory (Seattle)
Frederick William MacMonnies – American Monument
Hermon Atkins MacNeil – Confederate Defenders of Charleston
 Paul Manship
 Abraham Lincoln: The Hoosier Youth
 Group of Bears
 Henry Moore – Half-figure
 Felix Nylund – Three Smiths Statue (Helsinki)
 Rodgers and Poor – Kill Devil Hill Monument

Awards
 Archibald Prize: Ernest Buckmaster – Sir William Irvine

Births
 February 9 – Gerhard Richter, German painter
 March 2 - Benedetto Robazza, Italian sculptor (d. 2000)
 March 10 – Euan Uglow, English painter (d. 2000)
 March 14 – Norval Morrisseau, Aboriginal Canadian artist (d. 2007)
 April 10 – James Lee Byars, American artist (d. 1997)
 April 19 – Fernando Botero, Colombian painter and sculptor
 May 3 – Walter Hopps, American museum director and curator (d. 2005)
 May 4 – Ivor Wood, English stop-motion animator (d. 2004)
 May 14 – Yuri Khukhrov, Russian painter (d. 2003)
 June 5 – Christy Brown, Irish author, painter and poet (d. 1981)
 June 25 – Peter Blake, English pop artist
 July 20 – Nam June Paik, South Korean-born American video artist (d. 2006)
 August 6 – Howard Hodgkin, English painter (d. 2017)
 August 17 – Jean-Jacques Sempé, French cartoonist and illustrator (d. 2022)
 August 19 – Jacques Lob, French comic book creator (d. 1990)
 August 23 – Valentina Monakhova, Russian painter and graphic artist
 October 4 – Terence Conran, English designer
 October 14 – Wolf Vostell, German artist
 October 22 – Afewerk Tekle, Ethiopian painter and stained glass artist (d. 2012)
 October 29 – R. B. Kitaj, American-born English artist (d. 2007)
 December 7 – Paul Caponigro, American photographer
 December 16 – Quentin Blake, English illustrator
 December 26 – Ken Howard, English painter
date unknown – Basil Blackshaw, Northern Irish painter

Deaths
 January 15 – John Henry Dearle, English textile designer (b. 1859)
 February 6 – Hermann Ottomar Herzog, German American landscape painter (b. 1832)
 February 11 – Robert Gibb, Scottish painter (b. 1845)
 March – Elizabeth Taylor, American traveller and artist (b. 1856)
 March 5 – Johan Thorn Prikker, Dutch art nouveau painter and stained-glass artist (b. 1868)
 March 11 – Dora Carrington, English Bloomsbury Group painter and designer (b. 1893)
 March 21 – Georg Dehio, Baltic German art historian (b. 1850)
 March 23 – Boris Schatz, Lithuanian Jewish sculptor (b. 1866)
 March 25 – Harriet Backer, Norwegian painter (b. 1845)
 April 2 – Ella Gaunt Smith, American doll-maker (b. 1868)
 June 6 – Alois Dryák, Czech architect and designer (b. 1872)
 July 14 – Dimitrie Paciurea, Romanian sculptor (b. 1873 or 1875)
 July 19 – Louis Maurer, German American lithographer (b. 1832)
 July 21 – Samuel P. Dinsmoor, American sculptor (b. 1843)
 August 4 – Alfred Henry Maurer, American modernist painter, son of Louis (suicide; b. 1868)
 September 20 – Max Slevogt, German artist (b. 1868)
 September 23 – Jules Chéret, French painter and lithographer (b. 1836)
 September 28 – Emil Orlík, Austro-Hungarian etcher and lithographer (b. 1870)
 October 1 – W. G. Collingwood, English painter and author (b. 1854)
 October 2 – Carl Seffner, German portrait sculptor (b. 1861)
 October 17 – Lucy Bacon, American Impressionist painter (b. 1857)
 October 23 – Daniel Hernández Morillo, Peruvian painter (b. 1856)
 November 30 – Gari Melchers, American naturalist painter (b. 1860)
 December 8 – Gertrude Jekyll, English garden designer (b. 1843)
 December 9 – Karl Blossfeldt, German photographer and sculptor (b. 1865)

See also
 1932 in fine arts of the Soviet Union

References

 
Years of the 20th century in art
1930s in art